Andrew of Trier is recorded as the twelfth Bishop of Trier. He is   a pre-congregational saint, sometimes listed as a martyr.
Very little is known of his life, but he is one of a number of bishops of Trier from the time.

He is considered a saint and is venerated in Trier with a feast day on 13 January.

References

235 deaths
Gallo-Roman saints
Saints of Germania
3rd-century Christian martyrs
Year of birth unknown